The Al-Ras drum is a large drum used in the battle dance Ayyala, a folk dance of Qatar and U.A.E.  The Al-ras leads the dance and sets the beat for the smaller Takhamir drums that follow. There are many different shapes and sizes of drums. The biggest is called R'as (head).

Drums
Arabic musical instruments
Qatari musical instruments